Khezaras is a district in Guelma Province, Algeria. It was named after its capital, Khezara.

Municipalities
The district is further divided into 3 municipalities:
Khezara
Bouhachana 
Aïn Sandel

References 

 
Districts of Guelma Province